Warner Bros World Abu Dhabi is the world's largest indoor theme park in Abu Dhabi, United Arab Emirates, owned and developed by Miral at a cost of $1 billion. The park features characters from Warner Bros.'s franchises, such as Looney Tunes, DC Comics, Hanna-Barbera, and others. The park is located on Yas Island near Ferrari World, Yas Waterworld and CLYMB Abu Dhabi, and is the third Warner Bros.'s theme park. .  The WB Hotel  is the world's first Warner Bros. themed hotel and is located adjacent to the theme park. The park contains 29 rides, and shows.

History
Plans for the park began in 2007, but were halted by the Great Recession. Warner Bros. had signed a development contract with Aldar Properties in that year. 

In May 2015, Miral signed the general construction contract with Belgian contractor Six Construct, thus resuming construction that year. On April 19, 2016, Miral and Warner Bros. announced plans for the park's first phase to open in 2018.

Miral announced in February 2017 that ride delivery and installation had begun with many of the 29 rides being tested. On April 25, 2017, Warner Bros. Consumer Products and Miral announced that the park was on schedule at 60% completion, and revealed information about its six themed lands.

On July 24, 2018, the park was inaugurated by Vice President and Prime Minister of the UAE Sheikh Mohammed bin Rashid Al Maktoum, and the then Crown Prince of Abu Dhabi Sheikh Mohammed bin Zayed Al Nahyan now the UAE president.

On November 10, 2022, a Harry Potter themed land was announced to be coming to the park.

Design
The theme park is indoor and fully air-conditioned, as is typical of most major theme parks in the region due to the extreme heat in the summer. Standing at 1.65 million square feet, Warner Bros. World Abu Dhabi was named the world’s largest indoor theme park by Guinness World Records in 2019.

The facade features a  tower inspired by the iconic Warner Bros. Water Tower in Burbank, California. The theme park was designed by Thinkwell Group.

Layout
Warner Bros. World Abu Dhabi features six themed lands; Gotham City, Metropolis, Cartoon Junction, Bedrock, Dynamite Gulch and Warner Bros. Plaza. Gotham City and Metropolis are based on the fictional settings of DC Comics super heroes Batman and Superman, respectively, with attractions and live performers featuring costumes based on The New 52's character designs. Warner Bros.'s Looney Tunes and Hanna-Barbera cartoon libraries are represented in Dynamite Gulch and Cartoon Junction, along with Bedrock, which is themed around The Flintstones. Warner Bros. Plaza is meant to mimic the Hollywood of the past.

Rides

Bedrock
The Flintstones Bedrock River Adventure

Dynamite Gulch
Fast and Furry-ous
The Jetsons Cosmic Orbiter
Marvin the Martian Crater Crashers

Cartoon Junction
Tom and Jerry: Swiss Cheese Spin
Scooby Doo: The Museum of Mysteries
Cartoon Junction Carousel
Daffy Jet-Propelled Pogo Stick
Tweety Wild Wockets
Ricochet Racin' with Taz
Ani-Mayhem
Acme Factory

Gotham City
Batman: Knight Flight
Scarecrow Scare Raid
The Riddler Revolution
The Joker Funhouse
Rogues Gallery Games

Metropolis
Justice League Warworld Attacks
Green Lantern: Galactic Odyssey
Superman 360: Battle for Metropolis
Teen Titans Training Academy

See also
Warner Bros. Jungle Habitat
Parque Warner Madrid
Warner Bros. Movie World
Movie Park Germany

References

 
Amusement parks in the United Arab Emirates
Amusement parks opened in 2018
Indoor amusement parks
2018 establishments in the United Arab Emirates
Tourist attractions in Abu Dhabi
Warner Bros. Global Brands and Experiences
The Flintstones in amusement parks
Scooby-Doo in amusement parks